Jim Van Boven (born August 8, 1949) is a former American cyclist. He competed in the team time trial at the 1968 Summer Olympics.

References

External links
 

1949 births
Living people
American male cyclists
Olympic cyclists of the United States
Cyclists at the 1968 Summer Olympics
Sportspeople from Long Beach, California